Carzise is a hamlet in west Cornwall, England. Carzise is situated in the Cornwall and West Devon Mining Landscape which was designated as a World Heritage Site in 2006. It is in the civil parish of Crowan.

References

Hamlets in Cornwall